Allan Hunter (born 30 June 1946) is a former international footballer and manager.  Hunter began his career with Coleraine before playing for Oldham Athletic, Blackburn Rovers, Ipswich Town and Colchester United.  He managed Colchester United for eight months, only to return for a brief period as a coach at Layer Road.

As an international, he represented his country 53 times, 47 of which while he was at Ipswich, becoming the club's most capped player in Ipswich Town's history.

Club career
As a central defender, Hunter played for Coleraine (alongside his brother Victor), Oldham Athletic and Blackburn Rovers before making a £60,000 move to Ipswich Town, in a transfer that saw Bobby Bell heading to Blackburn.  Despite interest from Everton and Leeds, Hunter chose Ipswich when he met Bobby Robson – "...within five minutes I had no doubt that Ipswich was where I wanted to go."  Hunter spent the majority of his professional career with Ipswich, making over 350 appearances in his eleven years at the club, which included playing in the 1978 FA Cup Final in which Ipswich defeated Arsenal 1–0 at Wembley.

Fellow Ipswich player Terry Butcher wrote of Hunter in his autobiography, describing an incident where Butcher had "crossed himself" before a reserve match:

Hunter played in a full-strength Ipswich team against Stowmarket Town in a testimonial match in 1980.  Ipswich won the match 15–0. His nephew, Barry, was manager of Rushden & Diamonds.

International career
Hunter made 53 appearances for Northern Ireland, making him Ipswich Town's most capped international player. He also played alongside such notables as Alan Ball, Colin Bell, Bobby Charlton, Bobby Moore and Emlyn Hughes for the "New European Common Market" against the "Old ECM" in a match at Wembley celebrating the admission to the European Common Market of the United Kingdom, the Republic of Ireland and Denmark in 1973.

Management career
In 1982, Hunter accepted the role of player-manager at Colchester United where he appointed former Ipswich coach Cyril Lea as his assistant. Hunter did not last long in the position, and following the suicide of John Lyons in November 1982, he resigned from the club, leaving Lea in charge.

After retirement
Like many other ex-Ipswich players, Hunter settled in Suffolk following his retirement from the game.

In 2009, Hunter was inaugurated into the Ipswich Town Hall of Fame, along with George Burley, Arnold Muhren and Billy Baxter.

Managerial statistics

Honours

Ipswich Town
FA Cup: 1978

Individual
Ipswich Town Player of the Year: 1975–1976
Ipswich Town Hall of Fame: Inducted 2009

References

External links 
Allan Hunter, NI International Pride of Anglia - Ipswich Town Football Club
Allan Hunter career stats Post War English & Scottish Football League A - Z Player's Transfer Database
Player profile - Allan Hunter The Archive Database for Colchester United
Allan Hunter Northern Ireland Footballing Greats

1946 births
Living people
People from Sion Mills
Association footballers from Northern Ireland
Northern Ireland international footballers
Footballers from Suffolk
Blackburn Rovers F.C. players
Colchester United F.C. players
Ipswich Town F.C. players
Shamrock Rovers F.C. guest players
Oldham Athletic A.F.C. players
Colchester United F.C. managers
Association football defenders
Northern Ireland amateur international footballers
Football managers from Northern Ireland
FA Cup Final players